Trevor Carl Lee (born 3 July 1954 in Lewisham) is an English former professional footballer. He played for Cobham, Epsom & Ewell, Millwall, Colchester United, Gillingham, Leyton Orient, AFC Bournemouth, Cardiff City, Northampton Town and Fulham between 1975 and 1985. He played for Epsom & Ewell in the inaugural FA Vase final, losing 2–1 to Hoddesdon Town in April 1975 but left for a professional career with Millwall in November 1975, signing live on the Today programme with his teammate Phil Walker.

References

1954 births
Living people
English footballers
Epsom & Ewell F.C. players
Gillingham F.C. players
Millwall F.C. players
Colchester United F.C. players
AFC Bournemouth players
Leyton Orient F.C. players
Cardiff City F.C. players
Northampton Town F.C. players
Fulham F.C. players
Footballers from Lewisham
Cobham F.C. players
Association football forwards